BootManager, formerly known as BootMan, is the Haiku and BeOS boot loader on x86 systems. It resides solely in the master boot record and does not require installing Haiku or BeOS, although it must be installed from Haiku or BeOS. Its BeOS predecessor was BootMan, and was later renamed as BootManager by the Haiku project.

It is filesystem agnostic, and boots an operating system as if it were being booted directly from the hardware. As such, it can boot virtually any operating system. It can also chainload GRUB, LILO and NTLDR. However, being independent of an OS prevents it from being able to boot any disks which are not accessible via BIOS I/O routines (e.g. INT 13H), with the exception of BeOS disk-in-a-file images on FAT32, NTFS or ext2 file systems.

History
Bootman appeared in BeOS R4.0, replacing LILO, which was used in R3.x. Installing, configuring, and uninstalling can be done solely by a graphical application, also called Bootman. This can also create an MBR restoration floppy disk without modifying the current MBR. In Haiku Alpha 3, Bootman was rewritten and renamed to BootManager.

See also

 Haiku
 LILO
 Comparison of boot loaders

External links
 Bootman Source Code
 Boot Manager
 Boot Loader
 How To Get Haiku Booted

References

BeOS software
Free boot loaders
Assembly language software